Collatino is the 22nd quartiere of Rome (Italy), identified by the initials Q. XXII. It belongs to the Municipio IV and V. The name is derived from the Via Collatina. It has 66,829 inhabitants and has an area of 6.1646 km2.

It forms the zone urban zone designated with the code 15.b, with 30,362 inhabitants in January 2010.

References

External links